Rose Constance Gilchrist (July 17, 1895 – March 3, 1985) was an American stage, film, and television actress. Among her screen credits are her roles in the Hollywood productions Cry 'Havoc' (1943), A Letter to Three Wives (1949), Little Women (1949), Tripoli (1950), Houdini (1953), Some Came Running (1958), and Auntie Mame (1958).

Early years
Gilchrist was born in Brooklyn, New York and attended Assumption Academy. Her mother, Martha Daniels, was an actress.

Career
Gilchrist made her stage debut in London at age 22 in 1917. She eventually made her way to Hollywood, where she was signed by Metro-Goldwyn-Mayer to a 10-year contract in 1939.

After playing Purity Pinker in the 1954 film Long John Silver, Gilchrist reprised her role, as did Robert Newton, in the television series The Adventures of Long John Silver.  She is perhaps best known today for her role as Norah Muldoon in the 1958 film Auntie Mame, and her role in the 1949 film A Letter to Three Wives, in which she exclaims the iconic line "Bingo" while fainting. She was also seen on television's General Electric Theater.

Gilchrist's Broadway credits include Ladies and Gentlemen, Work Is for Horses, Excursion, and Mulato.

Personal life
Gilchrist married Edward O'Hanlon in 1922. Their daughter, Dorothy, was also an actress.

She was involved in a lawsuit in 1961, charging that a hair dresser had permanently damaged her scalp when tinting her hair. A news report said, "She contended that she is now confined to grandmotherly roles because her scalp will stand no more dyeing." She sought $50,000 in damages but received $5,000  ($ today) in a settlement.

Gilchrist was of the Roman Catholic faith and a lifelong Democrat who supported Adlai Stevenson's campaign during the 1952 presidential election.

Death
Connie Gilchrist died on March 3, 1985, aged 89, in Santa Fe, New Mexico. Her husband died on December 13, 1983. She is buried at Santa Fe National Cemetery in Santa Fe, New Mexico.

Complete filmography

Hullabaloo (1940) as Arline Merriweather
The Wild Man of Borneo (1941) as Mrs. Diamond
Barnacle Bill (1941) as Mamie
A Woman's Face (1941) as Christina Dalvik
Billy the Kid (1941) as Mildred (uncredited)
Down in San Diego (1941) as Proprietress (uncredited)
Dr. Kildare's Wedding Day (1941) as Jennie the Maid (uncredited)
Married Bachelor (1941) as Mother with Baby on Train (uncredited)
H. M. Pulham, Esq. (1941) as Tillie, Elevator Operator (uncredited)
Johnny Eager (1941) as Peg
Born to Sing (1942) as Welfare Worker
This Time for Keeps (1942) as Miss Nichols
We Were Dancing (1942) as Olive Ransome
Sunday Punch (1942) as Ma Galestrum
Tortilla Flat (1942) as Mrs. Torrelli
Grand Central Murder (1942) as Pearl Delroy
Apache Trail (1942) as Señora Martinez
The War Against Mrs. Hadley (1942) as Cook
The Human Comedy (1943) (listed in the cast, but did not appear onscreen)
Presenting Lily Mars (1943) as Frankie
Thousands Cheer (1943) 
Swing Shift Maisie (1943) as Maw Lustvogel
Cry 'Havoc' (1943) as Sadie
See Here, Private Hargrove (1944) (listed in the cast, but did not appear onscreen)
The Heavenly Body (1944) as Beulah - 'Delia Murphy'
Rationing (1944) as Mrs. Porter
Patrolling the Ether (1944, Short) as Phillip's Mother (uncredited)
Important Business (1944, Short) as Miss Larkin (uncredited)
Andy Hardy's Blonde Trouble (1944) as Mrs. Gordon (uncredited)
The Seventh Cross (1944) as Frau Binder (uncredited)
The Thin Man Goes Home (1944) as Woman on Train with Baby (uncredited)
Nothing but Trouble (1944) as Mrs. Flannigan
Music for Millions (1944) as Travelers Aid Woman
The Valley of Decision (1945) as The Scotts' Cook (uncredited)
Junior Miss (1945) as Hilda
Up Goes Maisie (1946) as Cleaning Lady (uncredited)
Young Widow (1946) as Aunt Cissie
Bad Bascomb (1946) as Annie Freemont
Faithful in My Fashion (1946) as Mrs. Murphy
A Really Important Person (1947, Short) as Mrs. Reilly
The Hucksters (1947) as Betty as Switchboard Operator
Song of the Thin Man (1947) as Bertha
The Unfinished Dance (1947) as Josie's Mother (uncredited)
Good News (1947) as Cora, the cook
Tenth Avenue Angel (1948) as Mrs. Murphy
The Bride Goes Wild (1948) as Nurse Tooker (uncredited)
The Big City (1948) as Martha
Luxury Liner (1948) as Bertha
Chicken Every Sunday (1949) as Millie Moon
A Letter to Three Wives (1949) as Mrs. Ruby Finney
Act of Violence (1949) as Martha Finney
Little Women (1949) as Mrs. Kirke
The Story of Molly X (1949) as Dawn
Buccaneer's Girl (1950) as Vegetable Woman
Stars in My Crown (1950) as Sarah Isbell
A Ticket to Tomahawk (1950) as Madame Adelaide
Louisa (1950) as Housekeeper Gladys
Peggy (1950) as Miss Zim
The Killer That Stalked New York (1950) as Belle
Undercover Girl (1950) as Capt. Sadie Parker
Tripoli (1950) as Henriette
Thunder on the Hill (1951) as Sister Josephine
Chain of Circumstance (1951) as Mrs. Mullins
Here Comes the Groom (1951) as Ma Jones
One Big Affair (1952) as Miss Marple
Flesh and Fury (1952) as Mrs. Richardson
The Half-Breed (1952) as Ma Higgins
Houdini (1953) as Mrs. Shultz
The Great Diamond Robbery (1954) as Blonde
It Should Happen to You (1954) as Mrs. Riker
The Far Country (1954) as Hominy
Long John Silver (1954) as Purity Pinker
The Man in the Gray Flannel Suit (1956) as Mrs. Manter
Machine-Gun Kelly (1958) as "Ma" Becker
Auntie Mame (1958) as Norah Muldoon 
Some Came Running (1958) as Jane Barclay
Say One for Me (1959) as Mary
Swingin' Along (1961) as Aunt Sophie
The Interns (1962) as Nurse Connie Dean
The Misadventures of Merlin Jones (1964) as Mrs. Gossett
A Tiger Walks (1964) as Liddy Lewis
A House Is Not a Home (1964) as Hattie Miller
Two on a Guillotine (1965) as Ramona Ryerdon
Sylvia (1965) as Molly Baxter (uncredited)
The Monkey's Uncle (1965) as Mrs. Gossett
Fluffy (1965) as Maid
Tickle Me (1965) as Hilda
Some Kind of a Nut (1969) as Mrs. Boland (uncredited) (final film role)

Television credits
Leave It to Beaver (1957) as Minerva, a maid, in the episode "Captain Jack"
The Restless Gun (1958) as Aunt Emma in Episode "Aunt Emma"
The Real McCoys (1961) as Mrs. Jensen
The Tall Man as Big Mamacita in the episode "The Great Western" (1961)
Going My Way, as Mrs. Reardon in "Blessed Are the Meek" (1963)
The Alfred Hitchcock Hour, two appearances in 1963
The Twilight Zone, as Mrs. Feeney in "In Praise of Pip" (1963)
Perry Mason as Natasha in “The Case of the Scarlet Scandal” (1966)

References

External links

1895 births
1985 deaths
20th-century American actresses
Actresses from New York City
American film actresses
American stage actresses
American television actresses
Metro-Goldwyn-Mayer contract players
People from Brooklyn
American Roman Catholics
New Mexico Democrats
California Democrats
New York (state) Democrats